Harold Bekkering (born 19 October 1965) is a Dutch professor of cognitive psychology at the Donders Institute for Brain, Cognition and Behaviour of the Radboud University Nijmegen. His research has covered many different ways of learning, ranging from basic sensorimotor learning to complex forms of social learning.  Lately, he aims to implement knowledge about human learning in educational settings.

Career
Bekkering was born in Oldenzaal on 19 October 1965. He studied psychology at the Radboud University Nijmegen between 1985 and 1990 and obtained a BSc. He obtained an MA in cognitive psychology in 1990. Five years later he obtained a PhD from Maastricht University. In 2000 he obtained his habilitation from the Ludwig Maximilian University of Munich.

Between May 1995 and December 2000 Bekkering was a senior researcher at the Max Planck Institute for Psychological Research. The next two years he was an associate professor at the University of Groningen. In October 2002 he was appointed a professor of cognitive psychology. Bekkering's field of research is broad, covering amongst others developmental and cognitive psychology, the implementation of cognition in robotics and cognitive neuroscience.

In the book De lerende mens Bekkering and Jurjen van der Helden expressed their findings and opinions on the future of education. Concerning the digitalization of education and especially the use of Internet Bekkering expects a broader, rather than deeper development of students, leading to a new kind of Homo universalis. The two authors criticized the preliminary policy paper Platform Onderwijs 2032 for not taking sufficient account of findings in psychology and neuroscience.

Bekkering was elected a member of the Royal Netherlands Academy of Arts and Sciences in 2016. He was elected a member of Academia Europaea in 2017.

Works
 Jurjen van der Helden & Harold Bekkering, De lerende mens, 2015, Boom.

References

1965 births
Living people
Cognitive psychologists
Dutch psychologists
Ludwig Maximilian University of Munich alumni
Maastricht University alumni
Members of Academia Europaea
Members of the Royal Netherlands Academy of Arts and Sciences
People from Oldenzaal
Radboud University Nijmegen alumni
Academic staff of Radboud University Nijmegen